Major-General Karl Alexander Wilhelm von Treskow (5 June 1764, Eiserwagen – 23 November 1823, Berlin) was a Prussian officer who fought in the Napoleonic Wars and was a Knight of the Order Pour le Mérite (Blue Max).

See also
Order of Battle of the Waterloo Campaign.

Notes

References

1764 births
1823 deaths
Recipients of the Pour le Mérite (military class)
Prussian Army personnel of the Napoleonic Wars
Major generals of Prussia